Braian Nicolás Molina (born 17 April 1995) is an Argentine footballer who plays as a defender for C.S.D. Macará.

References

External links

1995 births
Living people
Argentine footballers
Argentine expatriate footballers
Association football defenders
Instituto footballers
Venados F.C. players
Ñublense footballers
C.S.D. Macará footballers
Primera Nacional players
Ascenso MX players
Primera B de Chile players
Ecuadorian Serie A players
Argentine expatriate sportspeople in Mexico
Argentine expatriate sportspeople in Chile
Argentine expatriate sportspeople in Ecuador
Expatriate footballers in Mexico
Expatriate footballers in Chile
Expatriate footballers in Ecuador
Sportspeople from Buenos Aires Province
People from Moreno Partido